Twin Cities Pride, also known as Twin Cities GLBT Pride, is a nonprofit organization which runs an annual celebration in the Twin Cities of Minneapolis and St. Paul, Minnesota every June focusing on the LGBT community.

The celebration features a pride parade which draws crowds of nearly 400,000 people. The parade was designated the Ashley Rukes GLBT Pride Parade in honor of the late former parade organizer and transgender LGBT rights activist. Other Twin Cities Pride events include a festival in Loring Park and a block party spanning multiple days.

History
The progenitor to the Twin Cities Pride Parade was a 50-person protest march in 1972 on the Nicollet Mall in downtown Minneapolis, held on the third anniversary of the Stonewall riots. In 1973 pride events in Minnesota consisted of a "Gay Pride Week" including a picnic, a march, a dance, a softball game, and canoeing, featuring 150 attendees. 1974's pride event included the first transgender speaker.

The name was changed to "Lesbian-Gay Pride" in 1981, but changed back to "Gay Pride" the next year after an alternative Lesbian Pride event took place in Powderhorn Park. In 1983, the two events reunified to form Lesbian and Gay Pride.

The 1990s saw expansion of Twin Cities Pride activities, including vendor stalls and non-profit booths. The name of the organization was officially changed to "The Gay, Lesbian, Bisexual, and Transgender Pride Committee" in 1993, one of the first pride event organizations to add bisexual and transgender to its name. Multiple music stages were added in the mid-1990s; attendance in 1995 reached 100,000.

2010s 
Events organized in June by Twin Cities Pride in the mid-2010s include family picnics, music concerts, a 5K run, and a festival featuring hundreds of exhibitors and vendors. In 2017, a group of Black Lives Matter protesters briefly halted the LGBT Parade. They objected to police involvement in the parade after St. Anthony, MN, police officer Jeronimo Yanez's recent acquittal of killing of Philando Castile. In response to the protest, officers marched midway through the parade rather than at the front as planned. Twin Cities Pride parades now attract almost 400,000 viewers in its route along Hennepin Avenue in downtown Minneapolis. In 2018, a protest delayed the parade by an hour.

Archives 
The archives of Twin Cities Pride, along with material from Twin Cities-area LGBT activists and Pride festival attendees, are held in the Jean-Nickolaus Tretter Collection in Gay, Lesbian, Bisexual and Transgender Studies at the University of Minnesota Libraries.

References

External links

 Website of Twin Cities Pride
 2004 oral history of Twin Cities Pride published by City Pages

Annual events in Minnesota
Festivals in Minnesota
LGBT in Minnesota
Pride parades in the United States